The Mask of the Gorilla is a 1958 French action film directed by Bernard Borderie. It is based on a novel by Antoine Dominique (Dominique Ponchardier).

Cast 
 Lino Ventura - Géo Paquet - le gorille
 Charles Vanel - Colonel Berthomieu
 Pierre Dux - Veslot
 Bella Darvi - Isolène
 René Lefèvre - Commissaire Blavet
 Robert Manuel - Casa
 André Valmy - Mauricet
 Henri Crémieux - X.A. Pallos
 Jean-Roger Caussimon - Léon
 Jean-Max - Smolen
 Jean-Marie Rivière - Valério
 Yves Barsacq - Berthier

References

External links 
 

1950s action films
French action films
1950s French films